Hviid is a Danish surname. Notable people with the surname include:

 Bent Faurschou-Hviid (1921–1944), Danish resistance fighter
 Carl Johan Hviid (1899–1964), Danish film actor
 Frederik Hviid (born 1974), Spanish swimmer
 Jørgen Hviid (1916–2001), Danish and Latvian multi-sport athlete, and an officer in the Royal Danish Navy
 Morten Hviid, academic

Danish-language surnames